The 1946 Omloop van Vlaanderen was the second edition of the Omloop van Vlaanderen cycle race and was held on 17 March 1946. The race started and finished in Ghent. The race was won by André Pieters.

General classification

References

1946
1946 in Belgian sport
1946 in road cycling